Matt Kudu is a professional Canadian football player. He is currently a free agent and has previously played for the Winnipeg Blue Bombers and Toronto Argonauts.

Early years 
Kudu, born in Toronto and grew up in Mississauga, Ontario, attended Clarkson Secondary School and transferred to Lorne Park Secondary School where he won a Metro Bowl Championship as a senior in 2001. He was twice named Toronto Star All-Star and Toronto Sun All-Star while in high school. He also played in the Ontario Varsity Football League with the Mississauga Warriors and was an all-star lineman winning one OVFL Championship. He was inducted into the OVFL Hall of Fame in 2006.

Kudu studied at Eastern Michigan University and is pursuing his teaching certificate. He played in at least 11 out of 12 games all four years for the Eastern Michigan Eagles, was named Defensive player of the week three times, and named the Top-Conditioned Athlete at Eastern Michigan as a senior in 2004.

Professional career 
Kudu attended the CFL Evaluation Camp in 2005 and was drafted by the Saskatchewan Roughriders and spent the season on the practice roster. In April, 2006, Toronto Argonauts signed Kudu as a free agent and dressed for the first seven games of the 2006 CFL season recording five defensive tackles and two quarterback sacks before finishing the year on the injured reserve list with a knee injury. He played in both 2007 pre-season games for Toronto but was released before the regular season.

The Winnipeg Blue Bombers signed Kudu as a free agent on October 23, 2007, and re-signed him February 5, 2008. Kudu was released by the Bombers on March 16, 2009.

References 

Living people
Canadian football defensive linemen
Eastern Michigan Eagles football players
Eastern Michigan University alumni
Players of Canadian football from Ontario
Canadian football people from Toronto
Toronto Argonauts players
Winnipeg Blue Bombers players
Year of birth missing (living people)